Dasychalina fragilis is a species of sponge described by Stuart Oliver Ridley and Arthur Dendy in 1886. Dasychalina fragilis belongs to the genus Dasychalina and the family Niphatidae. 

The species' range is in the Philippines.

References 

Haplosclerida